Dr. Bailey Jacobson is an American orthodontist who is a recipient of Emanuel Earl Shephard Award . Jacobson is known for his contributions in the subject of cleft lip and cleft palate.

Life
Jacobson was born on the North Side of Chicago in 1934. He received his dental degree from Northwestern University Dental School in 1957.  He then spent two years in the US Army on active duty. After being discharged, Jacobson enrolled in the Orthodontic Program at Northwestern, graduating in 1961. He then became an instructor at the Northwestern Dental School, teaching Bacteriology and orthodontics until the school closed in 2009.

Jacobson's son, Ron Jacobson, is also an orthodontist.

Professional life
Jacobson was very active in the alumni community of Northwestern Dental School. He served as the chairman of the Alumni Resource Committee and the Dental Alumni Association. He was also a founder of the John R. Thompson Foundation.

Jacobson has over 50 publications and has written chapters in three textbooks.

Awards & Positions
 Cleft Palate/Craniofacial Journal - Reviewer
 American Journal of Orthodontics & Dentofacial Orthopedics - Reviewer
 Craniofacial Team at Children's Memorial Hospital, Chicago - Members (40 years)
 Northwestern Alumni Service Award
 Illinois Society of Orthodontists Outstanding Teacher Award - 2001
 American Board of Orthodontics - Diplomate 
 Earl E. Shepard Distinguished Service Award - 2004

References

Northwestern University Dental School alumni
American dentists
Orthodontists
Living people
Year of birth missing (living people)